Crash Nomada is a Folk Punk band based in Stockholm, Sweden. They are known for their mix of punk rock and different kinds of folk music from around the world.

The band is multilingual, but has mostly released songs in English and Swedish. In 2016 two singles produced by Jari Haapalainen, Mälaren and Ljuset som du sökte were released.

In 2017 Crash Nomada collaborated with the Egyptian singer Maryam Saleh and released the song Leih Ya Hamam which is a duet in Arabic and Swedish.

In an earlier formation, the band was called Dorlene Love.

Discography 
 Albums
 2008 – Exile Deluxe (under the name Dorlene Love)
 2012 – Atlas Pogo 
 2013 – Broar (EP)
 2018 – Crash Nomada 

Singles
 2011 – From town to town (singel)
 2011 – Itineranza (singel)
 2012 – Leila (singel)
 2016 – Mälaren (singel)
 2016 – Ljuset som du sökte (singel)
 2017 – Leih ya Hamam (singel med Maryam Saleh)
 2018 – Under en mörk europeisk himmel (singel)

Members 
 Ragnar Bey - vocals, acoustic guitar
 Linus "el Toro" Fransson - drums, percussion, vocals
 Mathilda Sundin - bass
 John Hagenby - electric guitar, cümbüş vocals
 Walter Salé - accordion, vocals
 Sara Edin - violin, vocals

Past members
 Tomoko Sukenobu - bass, vocals
 Felicia - percussion
 K. Ming -bass

References

External links 

Official Crash Nomada Site

Swedish punk rock groups
Swedish folk rock groups